Kerala Solvent Extractions Ltd, now known as KSE Ltd (BSE: 519421, NSE: KSE), is a company that is engaged in the manufacture of cattle feed, oil cake processing (extraction of oil from copra cake by the solvent extraction process and refining the same to edible grade), and dairy products in Irinjalakkuda, Thrissur District, state of Kerala, India. The Company was incorporated on 25 September 1963 and began commercial operations in April 1972 by setting up Kerala's first solvent extraction plant to extract coconut oil from coconut oil cakes. Subsequently, in 1976 the company set up a plant to manufacture ready mixed cattle feed. In the last three decades, KSE has emerged as a leader in solvent extraction from coconut oil cakes and also the largest cattle feed producer and supplier in Kerala. In 2000, KSE entered the business of procuring, processing and marketing milk and milk products. In 2002, KSE started producing and marketing icecreams under the brand name 'Vesta'.

Business segments
The company operates in three business segments: Cattle Feed Division, Oil Cake Processing Division, and Dairy Division comprising milk and milk products, including ice cream.

Cattle feed
KSE's cattle feed division is engaged in the production and marketing of cattle feed. KSE's cattle feed is largely made up of de-oiled rice bran cake, maize, and de-oiled coconut cake. Some quantities of cottonseeds are added to make a balanced feed mixture. The company produces seven types of cattle feed, three in mash form and four in pellet form. Today, KSE Ltd is predominantly a cattle feed producer with about 75% of its revenues in FY2014-15 coming from the sales of cattle feed. It has five modern cattle-feed factories and reported a sales volume of 440,000 metric tonnes in FY2014-15.

Oil cake processing
KSE's oil cake processing division extracts coconut oil from coconut oil cakes by using solvent extraction technology. The company operates two solvent extraction plants with a total capacity to process 90,000 metric tonnes of coconut oil cake per annum. In FY2014-15, the volume of cake processed was 68,500 tonnes that contributed 21% to the company's total revenues.

Dairy Division
KSE started operation of its dairy division on 22 January 2000. The idea of diversification into the dairy industry was the outcome of the desire for forwarding integration of the cattle feed business of KSE Ltd. The company market a wide range of dairy products in the market, including toned milk, toned homogenized milk, Ghee, Curd, Sambharam, and ice cream (under the brand name 'Vesta'). Its main area of operation is Thrissur and also some parts of Ernakulam and Malappuram.

References

External links
 Official website

Companies based in Thrissur
Chemical companies of India
Food and drink companies of India
Indian companies established in 1963
Irinjalakuda
Agriculture in Kerala
1963 establishments in Kerala
Companies listed on the National Stock Exchange of India
Companies listed on the Bombay Stock Exchange